Jean C. Chance is an American academic.

She received her JM (1960) and MA (1969) from the University of Florida.

She has served as a member of the Hearst Awards Committee for 25 of those years, and was also the chairman as well. In addition Chance has been a faculty member at UF since 1969. She was a professor of Journalism until her retirement in 2003, and was inducted into the UF Hall of Fame and Independent Florida Alligator Hall of Fame; she served as chairwoman of the Campus Communications Inc. board and Gator Wesley Foundation board.

References

University of Florida faculty
University of Florida alumni
Living people
1939 births